Sir Oudart I de Renti (died c.1370), Lord of Embry, Curlu, Affringues, and Vaudringhem was a French nobleman.

Biography
Oudart was a child of Baudouin I de Renty, Lord of Renty and Gertrude de Flavy, Dame of Aix-en-Boulonnais. He was banished from France, having been a follower of Robert de Artois and afterwards was actively involved with the English and Flemish. After being defeated, leading a Flemish army in 1347, he was pardoned by King Philip VI of France switching allegiance back to the French.

Renti joined with other French nobles in an attempt in 1349 to recapture Calais by bribing Amerigo of Pavia, an Italian officer of the city garrison, to open a gate for them. Oudart lead the force which entered Amerigo's gate. Having entered the gatehouse, the drawbridge was suddenly raised, a portcullis fell in front of the French and sixty English men-at-arms surrounded them. Amerigo had betrayed the French to King Edward III of England. Oudart and all of the French who had entered the gatehouse were captured. The ensuing battle outside the gates of Calais, resulted in the deaths of many of the French and a number were also captured, including the French commander Geoffrey de Charny. 

Oudart was appointed the governor of Tournai in 1364 and also pledged his support behind Bertrand du Guesclin, Constable of France who called for the expulsion of the English from France in 1370.

Marriage and issue
He married Jeanne Catherine, daughter of François, Lord of Azincourt and Clotilde de Cavron, Dame de La Loge, they are known to have had the following issue.
Oudart II de Renti (died 25 October 1415), married Jeanne de Bournonville, had issue.
Marie-Isabeau de Renti (died 1377), married Hugues de Ricametz, had issue.
Jean de Renti (died 25 October 1415).

Notes

Citations

References

Piers, Hector Beaurepaire. History of the town of Thérouanne, former capital of Morinie, and historical records on Fauquembergues and Renti. Lemaire, 1833.
Sumption, Jonathan. The Hundred Years War, Volume 1: Trial by Battle. University of Pennsylvania Press, 1999. 
Sumption, Jonathan. Hundred Years War Vol 2: Trial By Fire. Faber & Faber, 2011. 

Year of birth unknown
14th-century French people
French soldiers
Lords of France
People of the Hundred Years' War
Place of birth missing